Han Ningfu (1915–1995) original name Yu Shu, was a People's Republic of China politician. He was born in Gaotang County, Shandong Province. He was governor of Hubei Province.

1915 births
1995 deaths
People's Republic of China politicians from Shandong
Chinese Communist Party politicians from Shandong
Governors of Hubei